Joaquín Gottesman Villanueva (born 5 February 1996) is a Uruguayan professional footballer who plays as a midfielder for Sud América.

Career
Formed in academy of Nacional, Gottesman joined Progreso prior to 2017 season. He made his senior debut on 15 April 2017 in a 0–0 draw against Rentistas. He scored his first goal on 27 May 2017 in a 4–0 win against Villa Teresa.

Gottesman spent 2019 season on loan at Mexican second division club Correcaminos UAT and Colombian top division side Atlético Huila.

Career statistics

Club

References

External links
 

Living people
1996 births
Footballers from Buenos Aires
Association football midfielders
Uruguayan footballers
C.A. Progreso players
Correcaminos UAT footballers
Atlético Huila footballers
Uruguayan Primera División players
Uruguayan Segunda División players
Ascenso MX players
Categoría Primera A players
Uruguayan expatriate footballers
Uruguayan expatriate sportspeople in Mexico
Uruguayan expatriate sportspeople in Colombia
Expatriate footballers in Mexico
Expatriate footballers in Colombia